A Black Moon Broods Over Lemuria, is Bal-Sagoth's 1995 debut album after their 1993 demo. The album was recorded in a two-week period in June 1994, but due to label problems the album was released almost a year later. The name Lemuria comes from a hypothetical land mass in the Indian Ocean.
The keyboard intro on this album was written and performed by Keith Appleton, the proprietor of Academy Music Studio, the studio where the album was recorded.

On 13 May 2016 the album was re-released by Cacophonous Records as a special edition CD featuring remastered audio, expanded lyric booklet, new sleeve notes and exclusive new artwork.

'A Black Moon Broods Over Lemuria' remains the only one of the band's Cacophonous era albums to have been given a vinyl release, first in 1995 as a single disc LP, and then as a double vinyl gatefold edition in 2016.

In January 2018 the album was issued as a limited edition cassette version by the Malaysian label Diabolicurst Productions under license from Cacophonous Records. The edition was limited to just 100 copies.

Track listing

Personnel

Bal-Sagoth 

 Byron Roberts – vocals
 Chris Maudling – guitar
 Jonny Maudling – drums, keyboards

Additional 

 Gian Pyres (as John Piras) – guitar solo on "The Ravening"
 Jason Porter – bass
 Mags - engineering, producer

References 

Bal-Sagoth albums
1995 debut albums
Lemuria (continent)
Cacophonous Records albums